The John H. Wilson Tunnels are a pair of highway tunnels passing through the Ko‘olau Range on the island of O‘ahu.

The tunnels are named after former Honolulu Mayor John H. Wilson, who built the first carriage road over the Nu‘uanu Pali in 1898.  While mayor, Wilson advocated a tunnel connecting Kaneohe with Honolulu through Kalihi Valley.  The City and County of Honolulu spent US$12 million on the tunnels and highway. Construction started on the Honolulu-bound tunnel in January 1954, and the Kāneʻohe-bound tunnel in 1957. Five people died during their construction, and they were opened to traffic in November 1960.
The tunnels are now maintained by the Hawaii State Department of Transportation.

References

Road tunnels in Hawaii
Transportation in Honolulu County, Hawaii
Buildings and structures in Honolulu County, Hawaii
Tunnels completed in 1960
1960 establishments in Hawaii